Ralph E. Graham (born c.1944) is an American singer-songwriter from Roxbury, Boston, Massachusetts. As a songwriter he had success with the song "Differently" which was recorded by Thelma Houston, and Jerry Butler. After an initial album with Sussex Records in 1974 he signed to RCA for two more albums.

Discography
Differently  Sussex Records 1974		
Wisdom 	RCA	APL1-1918	1976		
Extensions RCA	APL1-2307	1977

References

American singer-songwriters
American male singer-songwriters
Living people
Year of birth uncertain